The Intellectual Property Corporation (IPC) is a production company based in Van Nuys, California. IPC was founded in 2016 by producers Eli Holzman and Aaron Saidman, and funded via private equity from three investors and former collaborators Sheldon Yellen, David J. Adelman, and Michael G. Rubin. IPC develops and produces a wide range of television, film, documentary, and interactive mobile content. IPC is known for series Leah Remini: Scientology and the Aftermath, as well as series including HBO's We're Here, the YouTube Originals feature documentary This Is Paris starring Paris Hilton and Mind Field, Selena Gomez's HBO Max series Selena+Chef, the Netflix series Indian Matchmaking, Showtime's docuseries Active Shooter: America Under Fire, and Free Meek and The Last Narc for Amazon. 

In August 2018, IPC was acquired by Core Media and relaunched the studio as Industrial Media. IPC has been recognized as one of the top 100 unscripted production companies globally by Realscreen, and has received nominations and/or won Primetime Emmy Awards, PGA Awards, and News and Documentary Emmy Awards for its diverse slate of programming. Its founders, Eli Holzman and Aaron Saidman, were recognized by The Hollywood Reporter as "Top 10" members of "Reality TV's Ruling Class" in 2017, with Holzman having previously created series including Project Greenlight and Project Runway, and the duo having produced Undercover Boss.

Productions

Television shows

References

External links 

2016 establishments in California
American companies established in 2016
Entertainment companies established in 2016
Entertainment companies based in California
Companies based in Culver City, California
2018 mergers and acquisitions